Josephus Theodorus (Joop) Puntman (March 20, 1934 in Bemmel – December 12, 2013 in Nijmegen) was a Dutch ceramist and sculptor.

Life and work  
Puntman studied at the Academy of Fine Arts in Arnhem. After his graduation he started to work at the Ceramic Workshop 'Handicraft' in Haalderen. Since its foundation in 1947, this studio manufactured vases, bowls and cups and saucers, and later on also wall sculptures. Puntman made various reliefs, which were placed mostly in schools. 

According to the database of the Netherlands Institute for Art History, he was active between approximately 1949 and 1969, but he is also then continue to produce active work until about 2005, sometimes commissioned, sometimes autonomous work. In the last years of his life his productivity decreased due to his age.

Works (selection) 
 1958 reliefs deer, sea horses and children, Gendringen
 1960 relief at school to Archimedes, Breda
 1960 relief Our Lady of Fátima in school at the MA de Ruyter, Hengelo
 1960? relief two horses at the school M. A. de Ruyter, Hengelo
 1963 bronze? relief 'Children playing', Nijmegen
 1965 Took Rense man and his work previously in Rabobank, now behind the church in Haalderen
 1965 Relief on the facade of the Rabobank in the High Street in Montfoort
 1968 relief at the school Klaproosstraat, Varsseveld
 1968 relief at the school Linthorst Avenue, Vriezenveen
 1968 ceramic relief Edith Stein, at the school Pastor Clercx Street, Zijtaart
 1970 relief Till Eulenspiegel with the joke of the left shoe at the school Hazelaarstraat, Vianen
 1970 Willem Barents relief to school in Meijhorst, Nijmegen
 1971 relief 'Prancing Horse' at Geertrudishof, Barneveld

See also 
 List of Dutch ceramists
 List of Dutch sculptors

References

External links 

1934 births
2013 deaths
Dutch ceramists
People from Lingewaard